The 2004 Torneo Descentralizado (known as the Copa Cable Mágico for sponsorship reasons) was the eighty-eighth season of Peruvian football. A total of 14 teams competed in the tournament, with Alianza Lima as the defending champion. Alianza Lima won its twenty-first Primera División title after beating Sporting Cristal in the final playoff.

Changes from 2003

Structural changes
The number of teams for the 2004 season grew from 12 to 14. The relegation system was re-introduced but the system was determined by a points per match average. The qualification for the Copa Sudamericana was determined by the aggregate table instead of the Torneo Apertura playoffs. Due to a structure change in the Copa Libertadores, only two teams will qualify directly to the group stage (the half-year champions) and the best-placed non-champion will have to play in the first stage.

Promotion and relegation
No teams were relegated from the 2003 season and thus the number of teams grew from 12 to 14. Segunda División champion Sport Coopsol and Copa Perú 2003 champion U. César Vallejo were promoted.

Teams

League table

Torneo Apertura

Torneo Clausura

Final

Title

Aggregate table

Relegation table

Updated as of games played on December, 2005.

Top scorers

Footnotes

External links
Peru 2004 season Details on RSSSF

Peruvian Primera División seasons
Peru
Primera Division Peruana